Phyllis Barrington (February 7, 1904 – June 20, 1989) was an American actress. Born Clara Parry and raised in Salt Lake City, she was the daughter of Mr. and Mrs. P. M. Parry. She was a graduate of Salt Lake's East High School. She attended the Major School of Acting in Long Beach, California and studied voice.

She was known for her roles in Hollywood films in the early 1930s such as Lewis D. Collins's The Law of the Tong (1931), with John Harron and Jason Robards Sr., Armand Schaefer's Sinister Hands (1932) opposite Jack Mulhall, Sucker Money (Victims of the Beyond) (1933), with Mischa Auer, and Melville Shyer's The Murder in the Museum (1934), with Henry B. Walthall and John Harron. Barrington also appeared in plays.

At some point before her father's death in 1938, she returned to her birth name and moved to New York City. She died in Los Angeles on June 20, 1989, aged 85.

Filmography
 Playthings of Hollywood (1930)
 The Law of the Tong (1931)
 Ten Nights in a Bar-Room (1931)
 The Drifter (1932)
 Sinister Hands (1932)
 The Reckless Rider (1932)
 A Scarlet Week-End (1932)
 The Racing Strain (1932)
 Sucker Money (1933)
 Under Secret Orders (1933)
 The Murder in the Museum (1934)
 Gun Smoke (1935)

References

External links
 Phyllis Barrington at IMDB

American film actresses
1904 births
1989 deaths
Actresses from Salt Lake City
20th-century American actresses